State Road 209 (NM 209) is a state highway in the US state of New Mexico. NM 209's southern terminus is at US 60/US 70/US 84 in Clovis, and the northern terminus is at I-40 Bus./NM 104  in Tucumcari.

Route description

History
The beginning part of NM 209 from the junction with US 60, US 70, and US 84 north to 21st Street (Old NM 523) was transferred to the City of Clovis in a road exchange agreement.

Major intersections

See also

References

External links

209
Transportation in Curry County, New Mexico
Transportation in Quay County, New Mexico